Kiryl Shawchenka (born 26 February 2002) is a Belarusian professional footballer who plays for Gomel.

Honours
Gomel
Belarusian Cup winner: 2021–22

References

External links 
 
 

2002 births
Living people
People from Dobruš District
Sportspeople from Gomel Region
Belarusian footballers
Association football defenders
FC Gomel players